(Francis) Vijay Rangarajan  CMG (born 22 September 1969) is a British diplomat who served as the British Ambassador to Brazil from June 2017 to August 2020. He currently serves as the Director General, Americas and Overseas Territories at the Foreign, Commonwealth and Development Office and served as the Deputy British Ambassador to Mexico from 2003 to 2006.

Rangarajan was born in New Delhi and educated at Cranbrook School and Selwyn College, Cambridge, where he graduated with a BA Hons. degree in 1990 and a PhD in Astrophysics five years later. Prior to working for the FCDO, Rangarajan worked for the UK's Ministry of Justice and Cabinet Office, focusing on political and constitutional reform.

He was made a Companion of the Order of St Michael and St George (CMG) in the 2015 Birthday Honours.

References

1969 births
Living people
People educated at Cranbrook School, Kent
Alumni of Selwyn College, Cambridge
21st-century British diplomats
Companions of the Order of St Michael and St George